Richard Daniel (24 December 1900 – 4 May 1986) was a general in the Wehrmacht of Nazi Germany during World War II. He was a recipient of the Knight's Cross of the Iron Cross with Oak Leaves.

Awards and decorations
 Iron Cross (1939) 2nd Class (12 July 1941) & 1st Class (28 July 1941)
 Honour Roll Clasp of the Army (25 February 1945)
 German Cross in Gold on 2 June 1943 as Oberst in Grenadier-Regiment 391
 Knight's Cross of the Iron Cross with Oak Leaves
 Knight's Cross on 25 July 1942 as Oberstleutnant and commander of Infanterie-Regiment 391
 (857th) Oak Leaves on 30 April 1945 as Generalmajor and commander of 45. Volksgrenadier-Division

Notes

References

Citations

Bibliography

1900 births
1986 deaths
German prisoners of war in World War II held by the United Kingdom
Major generals of the German Army (Wehrmacht)
People from Hesse-Nassau
People from Hochtaunuskreis
Recipients of the Gold German Cross
Recipients of the Knight's Cross of the Iron Cross with Oak Leaves
Military personnel from Hesse